Hardie Scott (June 7, 1907 – November 2, 1999) was a Republican member of the U.S. House of Representatives from Pennsylvania.

Hardie Scott, son of John Roger Kirkpatrick Scott, was born in Bala Cynwyd, Pennsylvania.  He graduated from the Taft School in Watertown, Connecticut, in 1926, from Yale University in 1930, and from the University of Pennsylvania Law School in 1934.

Scott was elected as a Republican to the Eightieth, Eighty-first, and Eighty-second Congresses.  He was not a candidate for renomination in 1952.  In Congress, Scott introduced the bill that authorized the creation of what eventually became Independence National Historical Park.

Hardie Scott was married to Mrs. MacRoy Jackson (née Almira Geraldine Rockefeller.)

Sources

References

1907 births
1999 deaths
University of Pennsylvania Law School alumni
Yale University alumni
Republican Party members of the United States House of Representatives from Pennsylvania
20th-century American politicians
People from Lower Merion Township, Pennsylvania